Eg is a neighbourhood in the city of Kristiansand in Agder county, Norway. The main hospital for all of Southern Norway, Sørlandet Hospital Kristiansand, is located on the north side of Eg. Eg is located between the river Otra and the Baneheia park.

The name Eg comes from Eik (meaning "Oak"), because of the thick oakwood which can still be found in the area. Some of the oldest settlements in Kristiansand are in the area of Eg. When the Kristiansand area was only farmland, one of the four largest farms was located at Eg. The others were located at Gimle, Grim, and Kjos.

Today, there is an elementary school and a kindergarten located at Eg. The neighbourhood is mostly apartments. Eg is served by bus line 12 from Kjos Haveby to the hospital.

See also
Kvadraturen
Kristiansand
Hospital of Southern Norway

References

Geography of Kristiansand
Neighbourhoods of Kristiansand